Antony Matheus dos Santos (born 24 February 2000), simply known as Antony, is a Brazilian professional footballer who plays as a winger for  club Manchester United and the Brazil national team.

Antony graduated from the São Paulo academy and made his senior debut for the club in 2018. He moved abroad to Ajax in the summer of 2020, where he won two Eredivisie titles and one KNVB Cup during his two seasons. Antony's performances in the Netherlands led to a transfer worth €95 million (£82 million) to Manchester United, the highest sum paid for an Eredivisie player.

Antony won a gold medal with the Brazil under-23 team at the 2020 Summer Olympics. He then made his senior international debut and scored against Venezuela in October 2021, going on to represent Brazil at the 2022 FIFA World Cup.

Early life
Antony was born in Osasco, São Paulo, Brazil, and grew up in Inferninho, a favela far from the city centre. Growing up, he would play football wherever he could on the streets or in his house, combining his love of futsal with street football and regularly attending São Paulo matches with his aunt. He is of Portuguese descent.

Club career

São Paulo

Youth
He began playing football at an early age, and he was soon spotted by São Paulo, who offered him a contract in 2010, aged 10, where he was inducted into their youth academy. During his youth years, Antony struggled for game time and was close to being dismissed from the club's youth ranks, but the staff convinced his manager to keep him. While in the youth academy, Antony met Helinho and Igor Gomes, becoming good friends in the process. In September 2018, Antony helped his team win the J-League Challenge tournament in Japan, being named the tournament's best player.

2018: Rise to the first team
Later that month, on 26 September, Antony, alongside Helinho and Igor Gomes, was promoted to the senior team, and he signed a contract until September 2023. On 15 November, he made his first-team debut, coming on as a substitute for Helinho in a 1–1 draw against Grêmio. He was immediately demoted to the club's under-20 team, in order to take part in the Copa São Paulo de Futebol Júnior, which his team won, scoring in the final against Vasco da Gama, while also being named the tournament's best player, for his 4 goals and 6 assists in 9 games he played in the competition.

2019–20: Campeonato Paulista success and final seasons
Following his impressive displays in the tournament, Antony returned to the first team, and with São Paulo struggling in the Campeonato Paulista, he began receiving more first-team minutes. He scored his first goal on 21 March, in a 1–1 draw against São Caetano, with the Tricolor conceding a goal in stoppage time. He immediately stood out as one of the revelations of the competition, scoring two goals, including one in the final against Corinthians a month later, where his side lost 2–1 on aggregate. On 18 July, he agreed to an extension until 2024.

On 5 March 2020, Antony made his debut in the Copa Libertadores, starting in São Paulo's 2–1 loss to Peruvian side Binacional. Following the outbreak of the COVID-19 pandemic, the season was halted for various months, and as such Antony made his last appearance for the club on 14 March, featuring in the 2–1 victory over rivals Santos in the San-São derby.

Ajax

2020–21: Development and adaptation to the Netherlands
On 23 February 2020, Ajax signed Antony on a five-year deal, effective from 1 July 2020, for an initial £13 million, which could rise to £18.2 million. He made his debut for the club on 13 September 2020, scoring the only goal of an away win over Sparta Rotterdam. He made his debut in the UEFA Champions League on 27 October, in a 2–2 draw against Atalanta, leaving the field in the 90th minute, following a collision with Ruslan Malinovskyi, before scoring his first goal in the competition on 3 November 2020, in a 2–1 away win over Midtjylland.

During the 2020–21 season, Antony competed with David Neres for a spot in the starting line-up, eventually winning his place, contributing to 46 appearances, and finishing the season with 11 goals and 10 assists, including a goal in the 3–1 defeat of Vitesse in the domestic cup final, helping Ajax win the domestic double of the Eredivisie and the KNVB Cup.

2021–22: Breakthrough and second Eredivisie title
The following season, despite the signings of Mohamed Daramy and Steven Berghuis, Antony kept his place in the starting line-up, and with his two goals and five assists against Sporting CP and Borussia Dortmund, Ajax became the first Dutch club to win all six Champions League group games in the competition's history. His three goals and one assist earned him the league's Player of the Month and Talent of the Month award for December. On 20 March, Antony scored a dramatic late winner in a 3–2 victory against De Klassieker rivals Feyenoord in Eredivisie, being five minutes into the added time, before being sent off, after receiving a second yellow card seconds later for time wasting.

Nine days later, while on international duty for Brazil national team, during a World Cup qualification match, Antony suffered an ankle injury, which ruled him out for the remainder of the season. He ended the campaign with 12 goals and 10 assists, as Ajax retained their Eredivisie title.

August 2022: Desire to leave Ajax

Following his return from injury against Fortuna Sittard on 6 August, the 2022–23 season was preceded by a dispute over the desire for Antony to leave Ajax. After Ajax rejected the interest expressed by Manchester United for Antony's service, including an €85 million transfer bid, he failed to turn up to training, being left out of the matchdays squads against Sparta Rotterdam and Utrecht. In an interview, Antony revealed that he had wanted to leave in February, but he waited to the end of the summer window for the transfer to proceed, rejecting a contract renewal from Ajax in order to "follow his dreams".

Manchester United

2022–23: Debut season
On 30 August 2022, Ajax confirmed they had reached an agreement with Manchester United for Antony's transfer. Two days later, Antony signed a five-year contract for a transfer fee of €95 million (£82 million), with a further €5 million (£4.27 million) in add-ons, the third highest transfer fee ever paid by the club after Paul Pogba and Romelu Lukaku and this was Ajax's and the Eredivisie's biggest transfer ever. Upon his arrival at the club he was handed the number 21 shirt previously worn by Edinson Cavani, who had recently departed the club.

On 4 September, he scored on his debut for the club in a 3–1 home league victory over rivals Arsenal. He scored again in United's next league match, a 6–3 defeat to local rivals Manchester City on 2 October. The next week, he scored for a third successive league game to equalise the score at Everton, as United won 2–1, becoming the first United player to score in their first three consecutive Premier League games.

On 23 February 2023, he also scored the winner in a 2–1 Europa League playoff match, coming on as a substitute at half time, versus Barcelona, a day before his 23rd birthday. On 26 February, Antony started in the 2023 EFL Cup final as Manchester United beat Newcastle United 2–0 at Wembley Stadium, winning his first trophy with the club.

International career

Youth
On 15 May 2019, he was named in the Brazil under-23 squad for the 2019 Toulon Tournament, helping his team win the competition, scoring two goals, including one in the final against Japan.

On 17 June 2021, Antony was named in the Brazil under-23 squad for the 2020 Summer Olympics. He started in all of Brazil's six games at the tournament. In the final against Spain, he assisted Malcom's winning goal in extra-time as Brazil won the title. He scored six goals in 22 games for the under-23 team.

Senior
Antony made his debut for the Brazil national football team on 7 October 2021 in a World Cup qualifier against Venezuela. He came on as a substitute in the 77th minute and scored a goal in added time to establish the final score of 3–1 for Brazil. On 7 November 2022, he was named in the squad for the 2022 FIFA World Cup.

Career statistics

Club

International

Scores and results list Brazil's goal tally first, score column indicates score after each Antony goal

Honours
Ajax
Eredivisie: 2020–21, 2021–22
KNVB Cup: 2020–21

Manchester United
 EFL Cup: 2022–23

Brazil U23
Summer Olympics: 2020
Toulon Tournament: 2019

Individual
J-League Under-17 Challenge Cup Player of the Tournament: 2018
FPF Copa São Paulo de Futebol Júnior Player of the Tournament: 2019
Campeonato Paulista Team of the Year: 2019
Eredivisie Player of the Month: December 2020
Eredivisie Talent of the Month: December 2021

References

External links

Profile at the Manchester United F.C. website

2000 births
Living people
People from Osasco
Footballers from São Paulo (state)
Brazilian footballers
Association football wingers
São Paulo FC players
AFC Ajax players
Manchester United F.C. players
Campeonato Brasileiro Série A players
Eredivisie players
Premier League players
2022 FIFA World Cup players
Brazil youth international footballers
Brazil international footballers
Olympic footballers of Brazil
Footballers at the 2020 Summer Olympics
Olympic medalists in football
Olympic gold medalists for Brazil
Medalists at the 2020 Summer Olympics
Brazilian expatriate footballers
Expatriate footballers in England
Expatriate footballers in the Netherlands
Brazilian expatriate sportspeople in England
Brazilian expatriate sportspeople in the Netherlands